The Republic of Moldova–Romania border is the international border between Republic of Moldova and Romania, established after the dissolution of the Soviet Union. It is a fluvial boundary, following the course of the Prut and Danube.

It is part of the external border of the European Union that runs from Criva in the north-west to Giurgiulești in the south-east.

Border crossings

A list of border crossings along the border between Republic of Moldova and Romania.

Opening times vary from crossing to crossing as well as from season to season.

Gallery

External links
Border Crossings: Moldova 
MOLDOVA-ROMANIA BORDER REGION

See also
Bridge of Flowers (event) 
Moldova–Ukraine border

References

 
Moldova–Romania border crossings
European Union external borders
Borders of Moldova
Borders of Romania
International borders